The 1997 Atlantic Coast Conference baseball tournament was held at the Florida Power Park in St. Petersburg, FL from May 13 through 17.   won the tournament and earned the Atlantic Coast Conference's automatic bid to the 1997 NCAA Division I baseball tournament.

Tournament

Play-In Game
The two teams with the worst records in regular season conference play faced each other in a single elimination situation to earn the 8th spot in the conference tournament.

Main Bracket

Seeding Procedure
From TheACC.com:
On Saturday (The Semifinals) of the ACC Baseball Tournament, the match-up between the four remaining teams is determined by previous opponents. If teams have played previously in the tournament, every attempt will be made to avoid a repeat match-up between teams, regardless of seed. If it is impossible to avoid a match-up that already occurred, then the determination is based on avoiding the most recent, current tournament match-up, regardless of seed. If no match-ups have occurred, the team left in the winners bracket will play the lowest seeded team from the losers bracket.

Bracket

(*) Denotes 10 Innings

All-Tournament Team

(*)Denotes Unanimous Selection

See also
College World Series
NCAA Division I Baseball Championship

References

2007 ACC Baseball Media Guide 

Tournament
Atlantic Coast Conference baseball tournament
Atlantic Coast Conference baseball tournament
Atlantic Coast Conference baseball tournament
21st century in St. Petersburg, Florida
College baseball tournaments in Florida
Baseball competitions in St. Petersburg, Florida